is a city located in Fukuoka Prefecture, Japan. As of June 1, 2019, Kitakyushu has an estimated population of 940,978, making it the second-largest city in both Fukuoka Prefecture and the island of Kyushu after the city of Fukuoka. It is one of Japan's 20 designated cities, one of three on Kyushu, and is divided into seven wards.

Kitakyushu was formed in 1963 from a merger of municipalities centered on the historic city of Kokura, and its name literally means "North Kyushu City" in Japanese. It is located at the northernmost point of Kyushu on the Kanmon Straits, separating the island from Honshu, across from the city of Shimonoseki. Kitakyushu and Shimonoseki are connected by numerous transport links including the Kanmon Bridge and the Kanmon Tunnels. Kitakyushu's Urban Employment Area forms part of the Fukuoka-Kitakyushu Greater Metropolitan Region, which, with a population of 5,738,977 (2005-2006), is the largest metropolitan area in Japan west of the Keihanshin region.

History

Kokura Prefecture
Kokura Prefecture was founded separately from Fukuoka Prefecture in 1871 when the clan system was abolished. The old wooden-built Kokura Prefectural Office is still standing and is being restored. It is opposite Riverwalk Kitakyūshū. In 1876, Kokura Prefecture was absorbed by Fukuoka Prefecture. The city of Kokura was founded in 1900.

World War II
Yahata in Kitakyushu was the target for the beginning of the US bombing raids on the home islands on June 16, 1944, when 75 Boeing B-29 Superfortresses flew out from mainland China.

Kokura was the primary target of the nuclear weapon "Fat Man" on August 9, 1945. Major Charles Sweeney had orders to drop the bomb visually. All three attempts failed due to clouds and smoke from Yahata, which is only 7 km west of Kokura and had air raids on the previous day, preventing him from identifying the target clearly. Additionally, a smoke screen was created by industrial workers burning barrels of coal tar and/or electric plant workers releasing steam. The bomb was ultimately dropped on the city of Nagasaki, the secondary target, at 11:02 JST.

City
The city of Kitakyushu was founded on February 10, 1963, and was designated on April 1, 1963, by government ordinance. The city was born from the merger of five municipalities (Moji, Kokura, Tobata, Yahata and Wakamatsu) centered around the ancient feudal city of Kokura. The city's symbol mark is a flower with the character  in the middle and five petals representing the towns that merged.

Geography and administrative divisions

Demographics
It is now the country's 15th most populated city. It has a much larger total area than that of Fukuoka which is only .

Wards
Kitakyushu has seven wards (ku):

The city of Nakama, Fukuoka was to become the eighth ward of Kitakyushu in 2005 (to be called Nakama-ku). However, the merger was rejected on December 24, 2004 by Nakama's city council, despite having been initiated by Nakama City.

Cityscape

Climate

Economy

Nippon Steel Corporation is a major employer, but the Yahata and Tobata plants are much reduced from their heyday of the 1960s. The Zenrin company known for its mapping and navigation software is based here and so is Toto Ltd. and Yaskawa Electric Corporation. StarFlyer, an airline, is headquartered on the grounds of Kitakyushu Airport in Kokuraminami-ku, Kitakyūshū.

A smaller scale shopping center known as Cha Cha Town, next to the Sunatsu bus depot in Kokura Kita ward, was created by the Nishi-Nippon Railroad and bus company.

In 2009 Bridgestone Corporation opened a plant in Kitakyushu to produce large and ultralarge off-the-road radial tires for construction and mining vehicles.

The GDP in Greater Kitakyushu, Kitakyushu Metropolitan Employment Area was US$55.7 billion in 2010.

Education

Universities and colleges

National universities
 Kyushu Institute of Technology

Public universities
 Kyushu Dental University
 University of Kitakyushu

Private universities
 Kyushu International University
 Kyushu Kyoritsu University
 Kyushu Nutrition Welfare University
 Kyushu Polytechnic College
 Kyushu Women's University
 Nishinippon Institute of Technology
 Seinan Women's University
 University of Occupational and Environmental Health

Junior colleges
 Higashi Chikushi Junior College
 Kyushu Women's Junior College
 Orio Aishin Junior College
 Seinan Jo Gakuin University Junior College

Technology colleges
 Kitakyushu National College of Technology

Vocational colleges
 Kyushu Medical Sports School

Research Institutes and graduate Schools 
 Kitakyushu Science and Research Park
 Graduate School of International Environmental Engineering, The University of Kitakyushu
 Fukuoka University Institute for Recycling and Environmental Control Systems
 Graduate School of Life Science and Systems Engineering, Kyushu Institute of Technology
 Graduate School of Information, Production and Systems/Information, Production and Systems Research Center, Waseda University

Transportation

Located at a strategic position on the south side of the Kanmon Straits, Kitakyushu is an important transport hub for traffic between Honshu and Kyushu and has a large port.

Air

Airport
The Kitakyushu Airport opened on March 16, 2006. It is larger than the previous Kokura Airport and supports 24-hour operations thanks to its location on an artificial island in the Seto Inland Sea. It will eventually be connected with Kokura Station by a new fast rail link. A new airline based in the city called StarFlyer began operations when the airport opened.

Railways
Kokura Station, the city's central train station, is the penultimate stop on the JR West Sanyō Shinkansen before the Fukuoka terminus and all Shinkansen services stop here. It is served by local and express trains on JR Kyushu's Kagoshima and Nippō Main Lines. In the city, transport is provided the Kitakyushu Monorail and buses.

Mojikō Station in Moji-ku is the northern terminus of the Kagoshima Main Line, the most important line in the JR Kyushu network.

A tram network operated by the Nishi-Nippon Railroad known as the Kitakyushu Line once operated in the city; after dwindling passenger numbers in the 1970s the line was shut down in stages between 1980 and 2000.

Roads

Expressways
The metropolitan area of Kitakyushu is covered by the Kitakyushu Expressway, which has five routes serving the city, totaling 53 kilometers of four-lane expressways. Some of these expressways are elevated, especially around the city center. Route 1 serves the city center, while route 2 serves the port area. Route 3 is a short connector between routes 1 and 2, and route 4 is the longest of the Kitakyushu Expressway network, serving most of the city from north to south. Route 5 is a short link serving the inner port area.

In addition, Kitakyushu is bypassed by the Kyushu Expressway, the main north–south route on the island of Kyushu. The new Higashikyushu Expressway begins in Kitakyushu and runs along the eastern coast of Kyushu. North of Kitakyushu, the Kyushu Expressway crosses the six-lane Kanmonkyo Bridge and turns into the Chūgoku Expressway, the second longest in Japan, serving western Honshu.

Bridges
There are several bridges in Kitakyushu and between the city and other places. The largest ones are the Kanmonkyo Bridge linking Kitakyushu and Shimonoseki (on Kyushu and Honshū respectively) via the Kanmon Straits and the Wakato Bridge linking the wards of Tobata and Wakamatsu. There are smaller bridges over the Onga River on the western border of the city.

On September 30, 2005, ownership of the Wakato Bridge was transferred from Japan Highway Public Corporation to Kitakyushu; on April 1, 2006, the bridge was transferred to the control of the Kitakyushu City Road Public Corporation.

Sea

Port
Kitakyushu is the largest ferry port in Kyushu, Chūgoku, and Shikoku. Ferry services operate between Kitakyushu and Shimonoseki, Matsuyama, Tokushima, Kōbe, Ōsaka, Tokyo, Ulsan (Korea), Busan (Korea) and isolated islands in the city limits. The main ferry port is at Shin-Moji, and there are ferries at Moji and near Kokura Station.

In the Kanmon-Kitakyushu area, there are three commuter lines: the Wakato Ferry, the Kanmon Straits Ferry, and the Kanmon Straits Liner.

Notable places

  was built by Hosokawa Tadaoki in 1602. It was the property of the Ogasawara clan (from Harima) between 1632 and 1860. The castle was burnt down in 1865 in the war between the Kokura and Choshu clans.
Kawachi Wisteria Garden is known for massive   flower  trellises.
The limestone outcroppings on Hiraodai are said to resemble grazing sheep, so the plateau, the highest in Kyushu at 400–600 meters, is also known as the Yogun Plain.
Some of the limestone caverns are open to the public. The area contains the Sugao and Nanae Waterfalls. Sugao is about 20 meters. Nanae means "seven stages".

Culture

The 1986 family movie Koneko Monogatari was filmed here. The English version of the film, which is the story of the friendship of a kitten and a pug dog, was released in America in 1989 as The Adventures of Milo and Otis.

The 1958 comedy Rickshaw Man is based on a local folk hero of Kokura called Muhomatsu or "Wild Pine" and has been called the Japanese "Desperado". He is celebrated in the Kokura Gion Yamagasa festival. Toshiro Mifune plays the taiko drum in this movie.

Kitakyushu is featured in the late 2012 Call of Duty: Black Ops II game developed by Treyarch and published by Activision as a DLC map called Magma. In the map the city has been abandoned due to a volcanic eruption, and parts of the city are completely covered in lava.

Festivals
There are festivals (matsuri) held in the summer in the city, including the Tobata Gion Yamagasa festival in Tobata-ku, Kitakyūshū.

 Kurosaki Gion (July)
It has been designated as an intangible cultural asset of Fukuoka Prefecture. People spin highly decorated "battle floats" as they pull them through the streets.

 Tobata Gion (July)
People carry yamagasa (tiered floats decorated with flags by day and lanterns by night) on their shoulders.

 Kokura Gion (July)
People pull yamagasa parade floats along the street.

All the Gion festivals date back about 400 years. They were instituted to celebrate surviving an epidemic.

 Moji Minato Festival (May)
This port-city festival involves colorfully costumed people pulling floats through the streets.

 Wakamatsu Minato Festival (July)
This port-city festival celebrates fire, drums, and kappa (mythical amphibious creatures who love cucumbers).

 Wasshoi Hyakuman Festival (August)
The Wasshoi Hyakuman Natsumatsuri brings all the festivals together for a grand parade and finale near City Hall in Kokura Kita ward. Kitakyushu was formed by the merging of Kokura, Yahata, Wakamatsu, Moji, and Tobata. As a result, the city began, on its tenth anniversary, to combine these local festivals into one. On the 25th anniversary, it was renamed Wasshoi Hyakuman because the city population had reached one million.

 Green Park Flea Market (monthly, except August and December)
There are over 200 shops.

Center for Contemporary Art (CCA) Kitakyushu. 
The Center for Contemporary Art opened in May 1997 by former Japan Foundation chief curator Nobuo Nakamura and Akiko Miyake.  The centre has shown works of internationally renowned artists such as Maurizio Cattelan and Anri Sala, and runs an internationally acclaimed studio programme for emerging artists.

Sports
Kitakyushu was selected as the host of the 2021 World Artistic Gymnastics Championships and the 2021 Rhythmic Gymnastics World Championships, both of which will take place in October 2021. The artistic gymnastics championship will take place in Kitakyushu City General Gymnasium, while the rhythmic competition will be contested in the West Japan Exhibition Centre.

Professional teams
 Giravanz Kitakyushu - Football, J3

Sporting venues

 Anō Dome
 Mikuni World Stadium Kitakyushu - Home stadium for Giravanz Kitakyushu
 Honjō Athletic Stadium
Kitakyushu City General Gymnasium
 Kitakyushu Media Dome - Indoor Keirin stadium
 Kitakyushu Municipal Baseball Stadium
 Kitakyushu Municipal Gymnasium
 JRA Kokura Racecourse
 Sayagatani Stadium
 Wakamatsu Kyōteijō - Wakamatsu Boat Races

Sister cities 
Kitakyushu is twinned with the following cities outside Japan.
  Surabaya, Indonesia (Since 1992)
  Dalian, Liaoning, China
  Incheon, South Korea
  Norfolk, Virginia, United States
  Tacoma, Washington, United States
  Haiphong, Vietnam
  Davao City, Philippines
  Phnom Penh, Cambodia
  – Ipatinga, Minas Gerais, Brazil (since July 24, 1978)

One city in Japan is twinned with Kitakyushu city.

  Minamikyushu, Kagoshima, Japan

Notable figures

Samurai
 Miyamoto Musashi, samurai swordsman, author of The Book of Five Rings and founder of the Hyoho Niten Ichi-ryū, famous for its use of two swords. He lived in the Kokura castle under the patronage of the Ogasawara and Hosokawa clans from 1633 until his death.

Writers
 The novelist Mori Ōgai lived in Kokura for years and his house is open to the public in Kokura Kita ward. He wrote Kokura Nikki (Kokura Diary) here. It is a ten-minute walk from Kokura Station.
 The writer Seichō Matsumoto was born in Kokura. The Matsumoto Seicho Memorial Museum dedicated to his work is located in the city center near Kokura Castle.
 The writer Ashihei Hino was born in Wakamatsu ward and his birthplace can be visited.

Scientists
 Professor Ted Fujita, popularly known as "Mr. Tornado" in America, was born in Kikugaoka in what is now Kokura Minami ward.

Sportspeople
 Masanobu Fuchi, Japanese professional wrestler (All Japan Pro-Wrestling)

Musicians
 175R, a Japanese punk rock band
 Ena Fujita, Japanese musician and gravure idol
 Ayaka Umeda, former Japanese idol and singer (AKB48, the subunit DiVA and NMB48)

Film directors
 Yamazaki Tokujirō, director of Call of the Foghorn and the Jiken Kisha series
 Aoyama Shinji, director of Eureka and Sad Vacation
 Oda Motoyoshi, director of Godzilla Raids Again
 Hirayama Hideyuki, director of Forget me Not

Actors
 Kazuhisa Kawahara, Aibō, Initial D and Kamen Rider Decade
 Takahiro Fujimoto, Saka no Ue no Kumo, Jin and Segodon
 Saaya Irie, God's Left Hand, Devil's Right Hand
 Tsuyoshi Ihara, Ninja, Dirty Hearts, Letters from Iwo Jima and Samurai Hustle (real name: Yun Yu-gu, Hangul: 윤유구)
 Junichi Haruta, Dai Sentai Goggle-V, Kagaku Sentai Dynaman, Kamen Rider Blade, Kamen Rider W Returns and Zyuden Sentai Kyoryuger

References

External links 

 City of Kitakyushu (English) 
 City of Kitakyushu City (Japanese)
 Newsletter Kitakyushu Bridges
 Kitakyushu city travel guide
 Kitakyushu Science and Research Park
 CCA Kitakyushu 
 Introduction to Kitakyushu (YouTube) 

 
Cities designated by government ordinance of Japan
Cities in Fukuoka Prefecture
Environmental model cities
Populated coastal places in Japan
Port settlements in Japan
Populated places established in 1963
1963 establishments in Japan